Badredine Bouanani (born 8 December 2004) is an Algerian footballer currently playing as a forward for Nice II.

Club career
Born in Lille, France, Bouanani started his career with local side US Ronchin before joining LOSC Lille in 2011. Having progressed through the youth ranks, he was named by English newspaper The Guardian as one of the best players born in 2004 worldwide in October 2021. During his time with Lille, he was seen as the best player to come through their academy since Eden Hazard.

In April 2022, it was rumoured that Bouanani would sign for Nice when his contract with Lille expired. In July of the same year, he made the switch to Nice.

International career
Bouanani has represented France at under-16, under-18 and under-19 level.

He is of Algerian descent and, after scoring for the France under-18 team in a 3–2 win over Algeria, he caused controversy by stating "Je suis Algérien" (I am Algerian), despite deciding to represent France at youth level.
Since this remark, he has opted to choose the Algerian national team and was called up to the main team in March 2023

Career statistics

Club

Notes

References

2004 births
Living people
French sportspeople of Algerian descent
Footballers from Lille
French footballers
France youth international footballers
Association football forwards
Championnat National 3 players
Ligue 1 players
Lille OSC players
OGC Nice players